Harold 'Harry' Luntz  (born 1937 in South Africa) is an Australian law professor. He is widely acknowledged as one of Australia's leading experts on torts law.

Career 
Luntz was educated at Athlone Boys' High School in Johannesburg and graduated from the University of Witwatersrand with degrees in arts and law. He served three years’ articles of clerkship at the same time as undertaking his law degree. In 1960, he was employed for a brief period as a solicitor in a firm of solicitors in Johannesburg and then took at Bachelor of Civil Law at Lincoln College, University of Oxford. He began publishing in academic journals in the early 1960s. Some of his appointments:

 1970 — Visiting Associate Professor at Queen's University in Ontario, Canada.
 1971 — Visiting Professor at the University of California, Berkeley.
 1976 — Professor, University of Melbourne.
 1986–88 — Dean of the Law Faculty, University of Melbourne.
  Visiting Fellow at Wolfson College, Oxford.

He was editor of the Australian Torts Law Journal. He wrote a text in 1974 that saw its fifth edition in 2008 ('Assessment of Damages for Personal Injury and Death'). This text is widely quoted in the highest courts of Australia, as well as England, Canada and the United States.

He is officially retired from University work, but he continues to maintain an office, teach, write essays and mark exams. Despite being an expert on negligence, he is a leading advocate of 'tort law reform' policy, that would replace the law of negligence with a no-fault compensation scheme, and/or provide such adequate social welfare that the awarding of damages becomes unnecessary.

He remains one of the world's foremost scholars and theoreticians of torts and damages law. On Australia Day (the 26th of January), he was awarded an AO for "distinguished service to legal education, as an academic and editor, to professional development, and to the community."

References

External links
A tribute from High Court Judge Michael Kirby on his retirement.

Living people
1937 births
Fellows of Wolfson College, Oxford
Australian legal scholars
Legal scholars of the University of Oxford
Officers of the Order of Australia